Românești or Romanești may refer to several places in Romania:

 Românești, Botoșani, a commune in Botoșani County
 Românești, Iași, a commune in Iași County
 Românești, a village in Berești-Tazlău Commune, Bacău County
 Românești, a village in Potlogi Commune, Dâmbovița County
 Românești, a village in Șimnicu de Sus Commune, Dolj County
 Românești, a village administered by Târgu Jiu city, Gorj County
 Românești, a village in Boiu Mare Commune, Maramureș County
 Românești, a village in Bărcănești Commune, Prahova County
 Românești, a village in Medieșu Aurit Commune, Satu Mare County
 Romanești, a village in Blăjel Commune, Sibiu County
 Românești, a village in Coșna Commune, Suceava County
 Românești, a village in Grănicești Commune, Suceava County
 Românești, a village in Tomești Commune, Timiș County
 Românești Cave, a cave in this village 
 Romanești, a village in Roșiile Commune, Vâlcea County
 Românești, a village in Nistorești Commune, Vrancea County
 Românești (river), a tributary of the Valea Neagră in Neamț County